Yankjah (Turkish (Iraqi Turkmen): Yenice) is a town in the Tooz District of Saladin Governorate, Iraq, approximately  from the Iranian border. Its native population of around 25,000 is predominantly Sunni Turkmen.

References

Populated places in Saladin Governorate
Turkmen communities in Iraq